The Castlegate Sandstone is a Mesozoic geologic formation in the United States. Dinosaur remains are among the fossils that have been recovered from the formation, although none have yet been referred to a specific genus.

Description

Composed of light gray to dark gray, thin bedded to massive, platy, fine to coarse grained, quartzose sandstone. Some conglomerate beds. The sandstone beds of the Castlegate are chiefly gray, unlike the sandstone beds of the underlying Blackhawk Formation, which are commonly some shade of brown. Locally, the Castlegate Sandstone beds are white. Commonly forms cliffs or steep slopes. The sandstone was deposited by rivers during the Late Cretaceous. The Castlegate Sandstone is 130-500 feet (40-155 m) thick. 

It gets its name from the gate-like passage that used to exist at the type section in Price Canyon. The western side of the gate was removed during highway improvement, which exposed most of the stratum. Fossil pollen indicate a late Campanian age.

See also

 List of dinosaur-bearing rock formations
 List of stratigraphic units with indeterminate dinosaur fossils

Footnotes

References
 Weishampel, David B.; Dodson, Peter; and Osmólska, Halszka (eds.): The Dinosauria, 2nd, Berkeley: University of California Press. 861 pp. .

Geologic formations of the United States
Campanian Stage